Fraugde is a village and southeastern suburb of  Odense, with a population of 2,093 (1 January 2022), in Funen, Denmark.

References

Suburbs of Odense
Populated places in Funen
Odense Municipality